Getting Strong! (the CD label has the subtitle of Wiggle and Learn) is the 26th studio album by Australian children's music group, the Wiggles. It is the Wiggles' first studio album featuring Sam Moran. It was released on 16 May 2007 by ABC, and distributed by Roadshow Entertainment.

Track list

Health and Physical Development

Language and Literacy

References

External links

The Wiggles albums
2007 albums